Robert Paton won the 2015 Harrison-Meldola Memorial Prize awarded by the Royal Society of Chemistry. Up to three Harrison-Meldola Memorial Prizes are awarded each year. Paton received the OpenEye Outstanding Junior Faculty Award from the American Chemical Society COMP division in Fall 2015.

Paton was formerly an Associate Professor in Organic Chemistry at the University of Oxford and a Fellow of St Hilda's College. Since 2018, He has been a professor at the Colorado State University in Fort Collins, Colorado.

References

External links 

 

English chemists
Academics of the University of Oxford
Year of birth missing (living people)
People from Stockport
Living people
Place of birth missing (living people)
Computational chemists